Thomas George Hayes (25 September 1908 – 16 May 1984) was a Welsh professional footballer who played as a centre forward or an inside forward. Born in Port Talbot, he played for the Wales Schoolboys team as a youngster and had spells with Port Talbot Athletic and Bridgend Town. In the summer of 1927, Hayes moved to England to join Barnsley, but he never made a senior appearance for the club. He transferred to Third Division North side Nelson in March 1928, one of several new signings by the club as they strove to avoid finishing bottom of the league.

Hayes made his Nelson debut on 17 March 1928 in the 5–4 victory away at Hartlepools United. He scored his first goals for the club the following month, netting twice in the 4–0 home win against Darlington on 7 April, and scoring a consolation goal in the reverse fixture a week later. Hayes made a total of nine league appearances for Nelson, scoring five goals, but was released by the club at the end of the 1927–28 season.

References

1908 births
1984 deaths
Sportspeople from Port Talbot
Welsh footballers
Association football forwards
Port Talbot Town F.C. players
Bridgend Town A.F.C. players
Barnsley F.C. players
Nelson F.C. players
English Football League players